Alligator Peak is located just southwest of Twin Lakes. This forested massif has been subjected to heavy logging and there are logging roads on all sides. Access is via logging roads north of Hatzic, past Davis Lake to the Lost Creek drainage. From a road that runs to Twin Lakes, take a west fork that runs almost right to the summit.

Alligator Peak was named after Alligator Point on Stave Lake.

References

Mission, British Columbia